Minbu is a city in Magwe Division, Myanmar. , the city has an urban population of 22,962. The area consists of low plain-land towards the Ayeyarwady River, and of undulating country inland rising higher and higher westwards towards the Arakan Mountains. Between the plain and the Arakan Yoma range is a distinct line of hills running north and south, and usually called the Nwa-Madaung hills. The chief streams besides the Ayeyarwady are the Mon, the Maw, and the Salin, which are largely used for irrigation. There are considerable fisheries along the Ayeyarwady and on the Paunglin Lake, which is a lagoon fed from the Ayeyarwady. Oil has been discovered near the mud volcanoes of Minbu, but it seems to lie at too great a depth to be profitably worked.

There is a large area of reserved forest near Minbu. The chief crops raised are rice, gram, millet, beans, peas, sesamum and tobacco. The betel-vine is largely cultivated along the Mon River. The annual rainfall varies greatly in the area. It is very considerable on and under the Arakari Yomas, and very slight towards the Ayeyarwady.

Points of interest
Shinbin Sekkeinte Pagoda
Nagapwet Mountain
Man Shwe Settaw Pagoda

Minbu Shwe Settaw

The footprints are well preserved and shrines have been constructed nearby. The place is known as the Pagoda site of the forest. The pilgrimage is combined with photography for young people, as the scenery is picturesque. One can go there also by Minbu- A Road following branches lane at  post. The site is on the river Man. The festival is held on the fifth waxing moon of the Myanmar calendar month, Tabodwe (February and March) annually. Many people, from different parts of the country, gather there and make meritorious deeps singly or collectively.

On the way from Minbu, visitors can pay homage to Sandalwood Monastery at Legging where the Buddha had visited in his lifetime. The history of that Footprint Pagoda dated back to the time of Buddha. Once the Buddha came to that site in the country of Sunapranta. He met the Orahat Sicca Vanda and Naga Nammada on his way and on their humble request, he granted their reverence. The footprints were enshrined ever since. The lower footprint on the slat is under water during the monsoon months as the river Man is flooded. Therefore, the festival is celebrated in the later winter months. Minbu is very hot in summer.

There are series of stalls marketing different things for the pilgrims and villagers nearly. The souvenirs can be bought there also. Minbu new market is very cheap to buy things. Shops are sell with wholesale price. A lot of motorcycles are going around in Minbu. People use motorcycles for their transportation.

From Minbu, there is a road can transport to Rakhine State and you can go the most famous pagoda Kyaungdawya Pagoda (ကျောင်းတော်ရာ).

In Minbu, there is a lot of crab and dried fish and dried shrimp (ပုဇွန်) you can buy. This is transport from Rakhine.

One of the Asian elephants (Elephus maximus) at Twycross Zoo in the United Kingdom was named after the city of Minbu, as Burma was the country she originated from.

Climate

Notable resident
 Ohn Maung

References

Populated places in Magway Region
Township capitals of Myanmar